Cristiano Preigchadt Cordeiro (born 14 August 1973) is a former professional footballer. He is currently the assistant coach of Hong Kong Premier League club Eastern.

Born in Brazil, he represented Hong Kong at international level.

Football career
Cordeiro started his career at Rio Grande do Sul playing at Sport Club Internacional since he was 14. Before he moved to Hong Kong, he played for Brasil de Farroupilha and Fortaleza EC.

Cordeiro joined South China of Hong Kong First Division in 1998. In the 2003–2004 season, due to All-Chinese policy induced by the club, he transferred to another First Division club Xiangxue Sun Hei.

Cordeiro was twice the Hong Kong Footballer of the Year (2000–01 and 2004–05) and he gained many awards since then.

In September 2006, he became a Hong Kong permanent resident, applied for the Hong Kong SAR passport and has been playing for the Hong Kong national team. He gained his first cap on the 2007 AFC Cup Qualifying round against Qatar on 11 October 2006.

Coaching career
Cordeiro joined Eastern in the 2013–14 season as an assistant coach. On 9 October 2013, he was appointed as the head coach of Eastern until June 2015.

In 2016, Cordeiro joined Kitchee as an assistant coach.

On 25 June 2019, Cordeiro's resigned from Kitchee in order to join Southern as an assistant under his former teammate Cheng Siu Chung. On 16 March 2020, following the departure of Cheng, Cordeiro became the co-head coach at Southern along with Pui Ho Wang. On 29 June 2020, Cordeiro left Southern.

International career
Updated 9 October 2009

Honour

Individual
Hong Kong Footballer of the Year (2): 2001, 2005

References

External links
 Profile on HKFA website
  

1973 births
Living people
Brazilian emigrants to Hong Kong
Footballers from Porto Alegre
Hong Kong footballers
Hong Kong First Division League players
Brazilian expatriate sportspeople in Hong Kong
South China AA players
Sun Hei SC players
People with acquired permanent residency of Hong Kong
Hong Kong football managers
Hong Kong international footballers
Tai Chung FC players
Association football defenders
Naturalized footballers of Hong Kong
Hong Kong League XI representative players